Damias caerulescens is a moth of the family Erebidae first described by Arthur Gardiner Butler in 1889. It is found on the Solomon Islands.

References

Damias
Moths described in 1889